Dadima was a town of Mesopotamia, inhabited during Byzantine times. It became the seat of a Christian bishop; no longer a residential see, it remains a titular see of the Roman Catholic Church.

Its site is located near Tadım in Asiatic Turkey.

References

Populated places in ancient Upper Mesopotamia
Mesopotamia (Roman province)
Catholic titular sees in Asia
Former populated places in Turkey
Populated places of the Byzantine Empire
History of Elazığ Province